Chrysopsis gossypina, the cottony goldenaster,  is a North American species of flowering plant in the family Asteraceae. It is native to the Coastal Plain of the southeastern United States, from eastern Louisiana to southeastern Virginia.

Chrysopsis gossypina is a biennial or short-lived perennial up to 70 cm tall. One plant can produce as many as 30 small, yellow flower heads, each head with both ray florets and disc florets. The species can grow in a variety of habitats and sometimes hybridizes with related species.

Subspecies
 Chrysopsis gossypina subsp. cruiseana (Dress) Semple - coastal sand dunes in Florida + Alabama
 Chrysopsis gossypina subsp. gossypina - open areas from Florida to Virginia
 Chrysopsis gossypina subsp. hyssopifolia (Nutt.) Semple - Louisiana to Florida

References

External links
Lady Bird Johnson Wildflower Center, University of Texas
North Carolina Native Plant Society
Alabama Plants
Digital Atlas of the Virginia Flora

gossypina
Endemic flora of the United States
Flora of the Southeastern United States
Plants described in 1803
Taxa named by André Michaux